Costa Rica is located on the Central American Isthmus, surrounding the point 10° north of the equator and 84° west of the prime meridian. It has 212 km of Caribbean Sea coastline and 1,016 on the North Pacific Ocean.

The area is 51,100 km2 of which 40 km2 is water. It is slightly smaller than Bosnia and Herzegovina.

Geology 

Costa Rica is located on the Caribbean Plate. It borders the Cocos Plate in the Pacific Ocean which is being subducted beneath it. This forms the volcanoes in Costa Rica, also known as the Central America Volcanic Arc.

The Caribbean Plate began its eastward migration during the Late Cretaceous. During the Late Paleocene, a local sea-level low-stand assisted by the continental uplift of the western margin of South America, resulted in a land bridge over which several groups of mammals apparently took part in an interchange.

Many earthquakes in Costa Rica have occurred.

Political and human geography

Costa Rica shares a  border with Nicaragua to the north, and a 348-km border with Panama to the south.

Land use: Arable land: 4.8%. Permanent crops: 6.66%. Other: 88.54%.

Administrative divisions of Costa Rica include 7 provinces, 82 cantons, and 478 districts. There are also 24 indigenous territories.

Physical geography

Islands 
There are many islands of Costa Rica, the most remote being Cocos Island and the largest being Isla Calero.

Mountain ranges
The nation's coastal plain separated by the Cordillera Central and the Cordillera de Talamanca, which form the spine of the country and separate the Pacific and Caribbean drainage divides.

The Cordillera de Guanacaste is in the north near the border with Nicaragua and forms part of the Continental Divide of the Americas.

Much of the Cordillera de Talamanca is included in the La Amistad International Park, which is shared between Costa Rica and Panama. It contains the country's highest peaks: the Cerro Chirripó and the Cerro Kamuk. Much of the region is covered by the Talamancan montane forests. It also includes the Cerros de Escazú which borders the Costa Rican Central Valley to the south.

Hydrology 

Irrigated land covers 1,031 km2.

Rivers of Costa Rica all drain into the Caribbean or the Pacific.

Extreme points 
Cocos Island is the southwestern extreme of the country. Otherwise to the north it's Peñas Blancas, to the south and east the Panama border, and to the west the Santa Elena Peninsula.

The lowest point is sea level, and the highest is Cerro Chirripo: at 3810 m.

Climate 
The climate is tropical and subtropical. Dry season (December to April); rainy season (May to November); cooler in highlands.

Because Costa Rica is located between 8 and 12 degrees north of the Equator, the climate is tropical year round. However, the country has many microclimates depending on elevation, rainfall, topography, and by the geography of each particular region.

Costa Rica's seasons are defined by how much rain falls during a particular period. The year can be split into two periods, the dry season known to the residents as summer, and the rainy season, known locally as winter. The "summer" or dry season goes from December to April, and "winter" or rainy season goes from May to November, which almost coincides with the Atlantic hurricane season, and during this time, it rains constantly in some regions.

Humidity is also higher on the Caribbean side than on the Pacific side.

Flora and fauna 

Costa Rica is a biodiversity hotspot. While the country has only about 0.03% of the world's landmass, it contains 5% of the world's biodiversity. It is home to about 12,119 species of plants, of which 950 are endemic. There are 117 native trees and more than 1,400 types of orchids; a third of them can be found in the Monteverde Cloud Forest Reserve. Almost a half of the country's land is covered by forests, though only 3.5% is covered by primary forests. Deforestation in Costa Rica has been reduced from some of the worst rates in the world from 1973 to 1989, to almost zero by 2005.

The diversity of wildlife in Costa Rica is very high; there are 441 species of amphibians and reptiles, 838 species of birds, 232 species of mammals and 181 species of fresh water fish. Costa Rica has high levels of endemism; 81 species of amphibians and reptiles, 17 species of birds and 7 species of mammals are endemic to the country. However, many species are endangered. According to the World Conservation Monitoring Centre, 209 species of birds, mammals, reptiles, amphibians and plants are endangered. Some of the country's most endangered species are the harpy eagle, the giant anteater, the golden toad and the jaguar. The International Union for Conservation of Nature (IUCN) reports the golden toad as extinct.

Over 25% of Costa Rica's national territory is protected by the National System of Conservation Areas (SINAC), which oversees all of the country's protected areas. There 29 national parks of Costa Rica many conservation areas of Costa Rica. Together protected areas comprise over one-fourth of Costa Rican territory. 9.3% of the country is protected under IUCN categories I-V. Around 25% of the country's land area is in protected national parks and protected areas, the largest percentage of protected areas in the world (developing world average 13%, developed world average 8%).

Tortuguero National Park is home to monkeys, sloths, birds, and a variety of reptiles.

The Monteverde Cloud Forest Reserve is home to about 2,000 plant species, including numerous orchids. Over 400 types of birds and more than 100 species of mammals can be found there.

Over 840 species of birds have been identified in Costa Rica. As is the case in much of Central America, the avian species in Costa Rica are a mix of North and South American species. The country's abundant fruit trees, many of which bear fruit year round, are hugely important to the birds, some of whom survive on diets that consist only of one or two types of fruit. Some of the country's most notable avian species include the resplendent quetzal, scarlet macaw, three-wattled bellbird, bare-necked umbrellabird, and the keel-billed toucan. The Instituto Nacional de Biodiversidad is allowed to collect royalties on any biological discoveries of medical importance. Costa Rica is a center of biological diversity for reptiles and amphibians, including the world's fastest running lizard, the spiny-tailed iguana (Ctenosaura similis).

Natural resources

Hydropower is produced from Lake Arenal, the largest lake in Costa Rica. Total renewable water resources is 112.4 km3.

Freshwater withdrawal is 5.77 km3/year (15%/9%/77%), or per capita: 1,582 m3/year. Agriculture is the largest water user demanding around 53% of total supplies while the sector contributes 6.5% to the Costa Rica GDP. Both total and per capita water usage is very high in comparison to other Central American countries but when measured against available freshwater sources, Costa Rica uses only 5% of its available supply.

Increasing urbanization will put pressure on water resources management in Costa Rica.

Gallery

See also
List of earthquakes in Costa Rica
List of Faults in Costa Rica
Costa Rica is party to the following treaties: Convention on Biological Diversity, Convention on Environmental Modification, United Nations Framework Convention on Climate Change, the Montreal Protocol, Ramsar Convention, International Convention for the Regulation of Whaling, Desertification Convention, Endangered Species Convention, Basel Convention, Convention on the Law of the Sea, Convention on Marine Dumping, and the Comprehensive Nuclear-Test-Ban Treaty. It has signed but not ratified the Convention on Marine Life Conservation and the Kyoto Protocol.

References

External links

Map of the Republic of Costa Rica from 1891
Costa Rica - another historic map